The Science Picnic is Europe's largest outdoor science-popularization event organized jointly by Polish Radio and the Copernicus Science Centre. It has been held every year since 1997. A wide range of research fields are represented at the Picnic, including the hard, natural, and social sciences together with the humanities. Research and teaching institutions from Poland and abroad reveal here behind-the-scenes aspects of their work and present science in ways accessible to visitors of various ages, using hands-on experiments and interactive exhibits.

The Science Picnic was commended by the European Commission in 2005 as one of 10 model European projects in the "Science and Society" field. The event has served as the inspiration for many other popular science initiatives, including the Copernicus Science Centre in Warsaw.

History
The first Science Picnic (as Science Picnic of Polish Radio BIS) was held in the Old Town district of Warsaw. During the first edition, 17 scientific institutions held scientific demonstrations in physics, medicine and archaeology in 13 tents, and the Picnic recorded around 3000 visitors. In subsequent years, the number of participating institutions and visitors grew rapidly. The event was moved to a larger public park in 2009 and then to the grounds of the newly constructed National Stadium in 2013. Since 2008 it has been organized jointly by Polish Radio and the Copernicus Science Centre. 
Recent attendance varies between 100,000 and 120,000 people, with the exception of the blowout years of 2006 and 2013, when the Picnic received around 150,000 visitors. 

Since 2013, Science Picnics are also held in Ukraine.

Organizers and initiators
 Professor Łukasz A. Turski, Center for Theoretical Physics of Polish Academy of Sciences
 Robert Firmhofer, Polish Radio (since 2006 director of the Copernicus Science Centre)
 Krystyna Kępska-Michalska, Polish Radio

Participating institutions
Each year the Science Picnic is participated in by institutions from Poland and abroad (including from Belgium, Bulgaria, China, Czech Republic, Denmark, Estonia, Egypt, Finland, France, Germany, Great Britain, Greece, Hungary, Ireland, Italy, Japan, Lebanon, Lithuania, Morocco, Mexico, Portugal, Slovakia, Slovenia, Switzerland, Sweden, United States).

External links

Official website

References

Recurring events established in 1997
Festivals in Poland
Science festivals
Science and technology in Poland
Events in Warsaw
Education in Warsaw
Tourist attractions in Warsaw
Polskie Radio
1997 establishments in Poland
Science events in Poland